Klauser may refer to:

Surname
Bartz Klauser, a fictional character and protagonist of the Japanese video game Final Fantasy V
Ernst Klauser (born 1934), Swiss footballer striker
Judy Klauser (born 1941), American gymnast
René Klauser (1929–2018), Swiss football defender
Thomas Klauser (born 1964), German ski jumper

Other 
St. Klauser or Rothklauser, one of numerous synonyms for the aromatic wine grape variety, Gewürztraminer
Klauser Schuhe, a German shoe company